Dance Jodi Dance Juniors is a 2018-2019 Indian Tamil-language kids dance competition reality television show, that aired on Zee Tamil from 25 November 2018 to 4 May 2019 on every Saturday and Sunday at 6:30PM and streamed on ZEE5. This is the junior version of the Dance Jodi Dance show, which premiered in 2016. The show about two kids contestants were going to dance together to win the trophy of Dance Jodi Dance Juniors. The show was judged by Sneha, Sudha Chandran and Laila. Deepak Dinkar as the host and featured a guest every week. The winner of the season was Nowfal and Darshan.

Judges and Hosts

Judges

Host

Contestants
finalists
The grand finale took place on 4 May 2019, Radhika Sarathkumar was the special guest at the grand finale of the show. Nowfal and Darshan emerged as the winner while Santosh and Dhanush emerged as the runner up of the season.

Contestants

References

External links
 Dance Jodi Dance Juniors at ZEE5

Zee Tamil original programming
Tamil-language children's television series
Tamil-language television shows
Tamil-language dance television shows
Tamil-language reality television series
2018 Tamil-language television series debuts
Television shows set in Tamil Nadu
2019 Tamil-language television series endings